Ardveenish is a village on Barra in the Western Isles, Scotland. Ardveenish is also within the parish of Barra.

References

External links

Canmore - A119 Ardveenish site record
Canmore - A125 Ardveenish site record
Canmore - A128 Ardveenish site record

Villages on Barra